Central Flying School is the Royal New Zealand Air Force (RNZAF) unit which is responsible for training the force's flight instructors. It was established at the start of World War II as the Flying Instructors School and assumed its current name 1941. The unit was stationed at RNZAF Base Wigram from 1945 until 1993 when it moved to RNZAF Base Ohakea.

History

Following the outbreak of World War II, the RNZAF established a Flying Instructors School (FIS) at Mangere near Auckland. The unit was subsequently transferred to Hobsonville and relocated again to Tauranga in 1941. At the time of the move to Tauranga the FIS was renamed the Central Flying School (CFS).

After the conclusion of World War II, the CFS was transferred to RNZAF Base Woodbourne near the South Island town of Blenheim. At about this time the unit established an aerobatic team, which was renamed the Red Checkers in 1967. This team was disbanded in 1973 as a result of the 1973 oil crisis, but was reformed in 1980; the team is currently staffed by volunteers from the CFS and the RNZAF's Pilot Training Squadron. The CFS moved to RNZAF Base Ohakea on the North Island in 1993, where it remains. In addition to its flight training role, the CFS also operates the RNZAF Historic Aircraft Flight's de Havilland Tiger Moth and North American Harvard aircraft.

As of 2013 the CFS shared Aerospace Industries CT-4E Airtrainer aircraft with the Pilot Training Squadron, and ran five month long flying instructor courses. Graduates of this course were posted to the Pilot Training Squadron, and may then be transferred to the RNZAF's operational squadrons after completing a six-month probationary period. In addition, the CFS was also responsible for auditing flying standards within the Air Force. At this time the CFS was the smallest flying unit of the RNZAF.

From 2015 the Airtrainers began to leave service with the introduction of the Beechcraft T-6 Texan II, and from about March 2015 the School came under command of the re-introduced position of Base Commander Ohakea, with the disestablishment of No. 488 Wing.

References

Central Flying School
Air forces education and training
Military units and formations of the RNZAF in World War II
Military units and formations established in 1939